Enoch Lee Drati (1940–2011) was an Anglican bishop in Uganda: he became Bishop of Madi-West Nile in 1995 and served for a decade.

Drati was educated at Uganda Christian University and ordained in 1973.

References

Anglican bishops of Madi and West Nile
20th-century Anglican bishops in Uganda
21st-century Anglican bishops in Uganda
Uganda Christian University alumni
1940 births
2011 deaths